Deepak Vohra is a 21st-century Indian diplomat and is currently the special advisor to Indian prime minister Narendra Modi.

Education and early career
Vohra graduated from St. Stephen's College, Delhi and St. Columba's School. He has also been educated at National Defence College (India) and University of Paris.

Prior to joining the IFS, he was an officer on special duty to the Technology Advisor to the Prime Minister. Vohra has also previously worked with Sulabh International and has been a part of United Nations assignments in Africa.

Indian Foreign Service
Vohra has served in France, Tunisia, United States, Chad, Cameroon, Papua New Guinea, Spain, Armenia, Sudan and Poland. In 1995 he was deputy high commissioner in Kuala Lumpur. He was Ambassador of India to Poland.

Fraud investigation
Vohra was questioned and three premises of his and associates were subject to search by the Enforcement Directorate in 2016 in connection to "alleged violations of foreign exchange laws in the issuance of certain government grants by India to friendly countries". The law enforcement agency recovered documents and foreign currency from the search of Vohra's premises. Vohra had served as "Honorary CEO" of a subsidiary of Angelique International. The Enforcement Directorate probed Vohra's role in facilitating corruption between Angelique International in which African politicians would receive kickbacks for obtaining contracts under Indian government grants. A source told the Times of India that Vohra "allegedly functioned as intermediary for some Indian entities obtaining soft loans for financing projects in Africa." Angelique International had been very successful, getting 62 projects worth $1.1 billion out of the 510 projects awarded between 2004 and 2014 under the Indian government's lines of credit program.

Later career
In 2012 he was Advisor to the Government of South Sudan. He was the news reader at Doordarshan in start of his career as a TV news presenter. He inaugurated the Apati War Memorial at Kargil.

References

Ambassadors of India to Poland
Living people
St. Stephen's College, Delhi alumni
Year of birth missing (living people)